Dellys is a district in Boumerdès Province, Algeria. It was named after its capital, Dellys.

Municipalities
The district is further divided into 3 municipalities:
Dellys
Ben Choud
Aafir

History

French conquest

 Shipwreck of Dellys (15 May 1830), commanded by Captain Armand Joseph Bruat (1796-1855) and Captain Félix-Ariel d'Assigny (1794-1846).
 First Battle of the Issers (27 May 1837), commanded by General Alexandre Charles Perrégaux (1791-1837) and Colonel Maximilien Joseph Schauenburg (1784-1838).
 First Assault of Dellys (28 May 1837), commanded by Captain Félix-Ariel d'Assigny (1794-1846).
 Second Assault of Dellys (12 May 1844), commanded by General Thomas Robert Bugeaud (1784–1849).

Algerian Revolution

This commune saw the creation of several clandestine torture centers during the Algerian revolution: 
 Camp Gualota in the commune of Dellys.

Salafist terrorism

 2007 Dellys bombing (8 September 2007)

Notable people

 Abderrahmane Abdelli, musician
 Habib Ayyoub, writer
 Abderrahmane Benhamida, former Minister of Education
 Abderrahmane Hammad, athlete
 Mokhtar Hasbellaoui, doctor
 Abderrahman Ibrir, footballer
 Rachid Nadji, footballer
 Sidi Yahya al-Tadallisi al-Thaalibi, imam
 Mu'izz ud-Dawla ibn Sumadih, ruler
 , Algerian footballer.

References

Districts of Boumerdès Province